Ibrahim Madkhali  [إبراهيم مدخلي in Arabic] (born 17 November 1984) is a Saudi football player who currently plays as a defender .

References
 

1984 births
Living people
Saudi Arabian footballers
Al-Riyadh SC players
Al Nassr FC players
Al-Faisaly FC players
Al-Raed FC players
Al-Qaisumah FC players
Al-Sharq Club players
Al-Najma SC players
Saudi First Division League players
Saudi Professional League players
Saudi Second Division players
Saudi Fourth Division players
Association football defenders